Vesperelater is a genus of click beetle (family Elateridae). They are one of several genera in the tribe Pyrophorini, all of which are bioluminescent. Most of the species were formerly in the genus Pyrophorus.

List of species
 Vesperelater arizonicus (Hyslop, 1918)
 Vesperelater gemmiferus (Germar, 1841)
 Vesperelater occidentalis (Champion, 1896)
 Vesperelater ornamentum (Germar, 1841)

References

Elateridae genera
Bioluminescent insects